Currency Lass was a 90-ton schooner, built in 1826 at Paterson Plains, New South Wales, Australia for Thomas Winder & others.

Career
Built on the Paterson River at Paterson Plains, she was built by convict labour and launched in October 1826. She plied the East Australian Coast, New Zealand and Hobart Town routes with cargo and passengers.

She transported convicts from Hobart Town to Sydney in 1834 and 1835 and transported convicts in Hobart Town in 1834.

References

Bateson, Charles, The Convict Ships, 1787–1868, Sydney, 1974. 

1826 ships
Ships built in New South Wales
Age of Sail merchant ships
Convict ships to New South Wales
Convict ships to Tasmania